Ibrahim Thiaw is a Mauritianian public servant who has been serving as Executive Secretary of the United Nations Convention to Combat Desertification (UNCCD) since 2019.

Early life and education
Born in 1957 in Tékane, Mauritania, Thiaw holds an advanced degree in forestry and forest product techniques.

Career
Thiaw worked in his country's Ministry of Rural Development for 10 years before joining the World Conservation Union (IUCN), where he served 15 years holding different positions. He was President of the PanAfrican Archaeological Association from 2014 to 2018. 

Thiaw joined the United Nations in 2007 as Director of the Division of Environmental Policy Implementation (DEPI) at United Nations Environment Programme (UNEP). From 2013 to 2018, he was Deputy Executive Director of UNEP at the level of Assistant Secretary-General, under the leadership of successive Executive Directors Achim Steiner and Erik Solheim. He was appointed to this position by United Nations Secretary-General Ban Ki-moon on 2 August 2013. In this capacity, he played a key role in shaping the organization’s strategic vision, mid-term strategy and programme of work, and strengthened collaborations with Governments and other environmental governing bodies, including the United Nations Environmental Assembly.

Personal life
Thiaw is married and has three children.

References

Mauritanian officials of the United Nations
Living people
1957 births
People from Trarza Region
United Nations Environment Programme